This is a comprehensive list of past and present local executives who, at least once, served the people of Barugo, Leyte. This was divided into three: the first are the gobernadorcillos, next are the precidentes municipal, and lastly are the contemporary local executives - the municipal mayors.

Gobernadorcillos
Capitan Julian Ponferrada
Capitan Eduardo Candaza
Capitan Isidoro Villasin
Capitan Eulogio Ponferrada
Capitan Epifanio Holasca
Capitan Tiburcio Alcober
Capitan (___?) Abanilla
Capitan Lino Arpon

Presidentes Municipales
Don Lorenzo Afable
Don Telesforo Ponferrada
Don Claudio Ponferrada
Don Vicente Araza (1909-1912)
Don Jose Astorga (1916-1918)
Don Jose Acuin (1922-1930, 1934-1936)
Don Vedasto Adrales
Don Emetrio Cabanacan
Don Felipe Gutierrez
Don Pablo Lausin, Sr. (1906-1908)
Don Celestino Astorga (1913-1915)
Don Wenceslao Ponferrada (1919-1921)
Don Agustin Villasin (1931-1933)
Don Julian Ala (1937-1940)

Municipal Mayors
Hilario Ayes (1944-1945)
Vicente Tiu (1945-1946)
Vicente Azores (1946-1947)
Laureano Claros (1948-1951)
Lorenzo Afable (1952-1955, 1968-1971)
Mariano Delgado(1956-1959)
Angel Tiu (1959)
Marciano Cañeda (1960-1963)
Julian Cañeda (1964-1967)
Dionesio Delgado (1972-1979)
Antonio Tiu (1980-1986)
Virgilio Buñales (Appointed OIC, 1986-1987)
Wilfredo Avestruz (1988-1998)
Juliana Villasin (1998-2007)
Alden Avestruz (2007-2016)
Ma. Rosario Avestruz (2016-2022)
Dr. Aron C. Balais (2022-present)

See also

Barugo, Leyte
Current Elected Local Government Officials of Barugo

Barugo
Politics of Leyte (province)